{{chembox
| Verifiedfields = changed
| Watchedfields = changed
| verifiedrevid = 477204010
| ImageFile = Dimethylhydrazin.svg
| ImageFile_Ref = 
| ImageSize = 160
| ImageName = Skeletal formula of 1,2-dimethylhydrazine with all implicit hydrogens shown
| ImageFile1 = 1,2-dimethylhydrazine-3D-balls.png
| ImageFile1_Ref = 
| ImageSize1 = 100
| ImageName1 = Ball and stick model of 1,2-dimethylhydrazine
| PIN = 1,2-Dimethylhydrazine
| OtherNames = {{Unbulleted list|N,''N-Dimethylhydrazine|sym-Dimethylhydrazine|Hydrazomethane}}
|Section1=
|Section2=
|Section3=
|Section7=
|Section8=
}}symmetrical dimethylhydrazine, or 1,2-Dimethylhydrazine''', is the organic compound with the formula (CH3NH)2. It is one of the two isomers of dimethylhydrazine.  Both isomers are colorless liquids at room temperature, with properties similar to those of methylamines. Symmetrical dimethylhydrazine is a potent carcinogen that acts as a DNA methylating agent. The compound has no commercial value, in contrast to its isomer, which is used as a rocket fuel.

It is used to induce colon tumors in experimental animals - particularly mice and feline cell samples.

See also 
 Unsymmetrical dimethylhydrazine

References

Methylating agents
IARC Group 2A carcinogens
Hydrazines